Christopher Paul Smith II (born May 1, 2000) is an American football strong safety. He was a two-time CFP national champion with Georgia, winning in 2021 and 2022.

High school career 
Smith attended Hapeville Charter Career Academy in Union City, Georgia. As a senior, Smith recorded five interceptions and seven pass break-ups with 54 tackles. As a three-star recruit, Smith chose to play college football at the University of Georgia, following teammate William Poole.

College career 
Smith played sparingly in his first two seasons at Georgia. Smith would play in all ten games in 2020, and he would increase his production after starter Richard LeCounte got into a motorcycle accident in 2020. In 2021, Smith would become the full time starter. In week one against Clemson, Smith intercepted Clemson quarterback DJ Uiagalelei, and returned it 74 yards for the only touchdown of the game, which resulted in a 10-3 Georgia victory. Over the course of the season, Smith played in 12 games amassing 34 tackles, and recording three interceptions. In the 2022 College Football Playoff National Championship Game, Smith would tally one interception and a career high seven tackles in Georgia's win. Shortly after the game, Smith announced he would return to Georgia using the extra year of eligibility given by the NCAA because of the shortened 2020 season due to the COVID-19 pandemic.

References

External links 
 Georgia Bulldogs bio

Living people
2000 births
All-American college football players
American football safeties
Georgia Bulldogs football players
Players of American football from Atlanta